Korase is a small village in Minuwangoda Divisional Secretariat of Sri Lanka, with lush green surroundings.

Populated places in Gampaha District